Goa is currently India's smallest state on the west coast, and its writers have written in many diverse languages. Poetry is a small and scattered field in the region, and this page makes an attempt to acknowledge those who have contributed to the field. It includes those listed below who have contributed to poetry in and from Goa, as well as those writing poetry in Goa. Poetry related to Goa (specially by those from the region) is known to have been written in Konkani (in the officially-acknkowledged Devanagari and the popularly-used Roman scripts, apart from others), in Portuguese, English and Marathi, apart from other regional, national and international languages to a lesser extent.

Some prominent names from the past

Father Thomas Stephens, an English Jesuit living in Goa, "wrote the first Konkani grammar book and an epic 11,000-line Marathi poem, now regarded as a classic."

Eunice de Souza, herself a prominent poet in English, writes: "Joseph Furtado, who wrote in English and in Portuguese was one of the first poets to use what we now call “Indian English.” “Fortune teller, memsahib!/Tell fortune very well…/” There’s the great modernist, F N Souza. And we are probably the only people in the world to write an ode to sorpotel! In addition, poets such as the late Santan Rodrigues, Melanie Silgardo, and Raul da Gama Rose played an important role in poetry in English in the 1970s. They started a poets’ cooperative named Newground and published some volumes of poetry. Melanie, who has been living in London for some years recently co-edited with me an anthology called These My Words, The Penguin Book of Indian Poetry which includes translations of poems in all Indian languages, and poems in English."

Augusto Pinto, reviewer, writes of Joseph "Furtado, who passed away in 1947 at the age of 75, was one of the finest Indian English poets of his time" in a detailed article in the Himal magazine, published from Kathmandu

Comments on poetry in and from Goa

Peter Nazareth, the editor of the first anthology in English of Goan writing, comments: "I found some of the literature very strange, particularly poetry written before the fifties. The subjects seemed hopelessly romantic, the treatment archaic, the psyche concerned with the irrelevant. Was it just because I was out of touch? Or was it that being involved with the exciting, creative, literature of a whole continent, Africa, my responses were sound: that Goan writers were trapped in a deep, airless well?"

Goa Today, the monthly magazine from the region, has an article on Goan poets in English.

Konkani (Devanagari)
 Bakibab Borkar
 RV Pandit
 Uday Bhembre
 Veni Madhav Borkar
 Ramesh Veluskar
 Shashikant Punaji
 John Aguiar

Konkani (Roman script)

 Fr. Vasco do Rego SJ, known for his flawless metre and rhyme and beauty of language.
 Walter Menezes

English
 Joseph Furtado
 Dom Moraes
 Armando Menezes
 Leslie de Noronha
 Santan Rodrigues
 Manuel Rodrigues
 Eunice De Souza
 Innocent Sousa
 Antonio Gomes
 Jerry Pinto
 Manohar Shetty
 Tony Fernandes
 Margaret Mascarenhas
 António Mascarenhas
 Frederika Menezes
 Rochelle Potkar
 Gerson da Cunha
Sheena Cecilia Pereira
 Mark Rocha

Marathi
 Vishnu Wagh

Portuguese

 Nascimento Mendonça (1884–1927) 
 Orlando da Costa
 Paulino Dias (1874–1919)
 Adeodato Barreto (1905-1937)
 Floriano Barreto (1877–1905)
 Prof. Laxmanrao Sardessai
 Ananta Rau Sar Dessai
 Judit Beatriz de Souza(1933–2011)
 Vimala Devi (1936)
 Jose Filipe Neri Soares Rebelo
 Telo Mascarenhas
 Oscar Monteiro

External links

General
 Muse India Focus - Goan Literature. 2013.
 Discussion on this page, via the Goa Book Club
 Goa Art and Literature Festival, covers poetry too
 Catalog Record: Goan poetry -- an anthology of verse by living Goan poets. Hathi Trust Digital Library
 Goan Poetry: An Anthology of Verse by Living Goan Poets
 Slam poetry retreat in Goa
 Word Up, the interaction of poetry and activism, at The Goa Project
 Languages and poetry in Goa
 Poets of Goa
 A word about Goan poetry, Ben Antao
 Poet Edwin Thumboo (Singapore), speaks in Goa
 Poetry Spoken With A Cause

English
 Anglophone poetry in colonial India (Joseph Furtado)
 The Goan Fiddler, by Augusto Pinto, Himal, 2009
 Poets of Goa
 Notes on Love

Konkani
 Konkani Poetry of Goa (1961-2005), a review
 Konkani poetry section of Goa University
 A Review of Konkani Poetry After Goa's Liberation - Scribd
 Ugtem Molob, a Konkani Poets' Meet in Goa, audio recording
 Manoharrai Sardessai, the Crown Prince of Konkani Poetry
 Bakibab Borkar, by Veena Patwardhan
 Some Goan Konkani Poets, John Aguiar's blog

Marathi
 The Marathi poet of Goa
 Feminist Marathi poetry of Vishnu Wagh

Portuguese
 What happened to Indian literature in Portuguese?
 Desassossego in Luso-Indian Goan Poetry (George V Coelho)

References

Lists of people from Goa
Poets from Goa
Lists of Indian poets